Knight v. Commissioner, 552 U.S. 181 (2008), was a United States Supreme Court case that addressed the tax deductibility of investment advisory fees paid by a trust.

References

United States Supreme Court cases
2008 in United States case law
United States taxation and revenue case law
United States Supreme Court cases of the Roberts Court